Carubicin is an anthracycline.

References

Anthracyclines
Drugs in the Soviet Union